Sigtrygg Gnupasson was semi-legendary a king of Denmark of the House of Olaf who ruled in the 10th century, according to Adam of Bremen.

Sigtrygg was son of Gnupa and the Danish noblewoman Asfrid. According to Adam, he became a Danish king during the tenure of Archbishop Hoger of Bremen (909–915/7). He is remembered on the two Sigtrygg Runestones found near Schleswig, (DR2 and DR4), erected by his mother after his death, suggesting this area represented the power-base of the family.

Based on the testimony of king Sweyn, Adam reports that prior to Hoger's death, Harthacnut came to Denmark and immediately deposed the young king Sigtrygg. However other sources show a Chnuba (usually identified with Gnupa, Sigtrygg's father) still ruling in 934, while Heimskringla reports Gnupa's defeat by Gorm the Old, again placing his death later than Adam would have it. Gesta Wulinensis ecclesiae pontificum tells that Gnupa outlived his son Sigtrygg. 
Adam himself mentions the existence of other kings at this time and expresses doubt that Denmark represented a single united realm.

References

10th-century deaths
10th-century kings of Denmark
Year of birth unknown